A Barbados passport is a travel document issued to citizens of Barbados, in accordance with Citizenship Act (CAP. 186) from 1978, the Immigration Act (CAP. 190) from 1997, and the Barbados Constitution, for the purpose of facilitating international travel. It allows the bearer to travel to foreign countries in accordance with visa requirements, and facilitates the process of securing assistance from Barbados consular officials abroad, if necessary.

A Barbados passport is a document for valid proof of citizenship. The passport is also a Caricom passport, as Barbados is a member of the Caribbean Community. There are three types of passport booklets: regular, service, or diplomatic passports. Despite the placement of the Caribbean Community (CARICOM) logo at the top of the document's cover-page, Barbados passports are issued by the Immigration Department under the auspices of the Office of the Prime Minister, and at the Diplomatic Missions and Honorary Consulates of Barbados abroad.

Types of passports
Regular Barbados citizens are eligible to apply for a passport. A passport for a person under 16 years of age is valid for five years; a passport for persons 16 years and above is valid for ten years.

Application
All applicants aged 16 or above are entitled to apply for a standard Barbados passport.
Minors aged 15 and below may remain on their parent's passport.

Passport fees (Effective 1 December 2010)
Standard
Adult's passport, $150
Minor's passport, $100

Business
Business persons' passport, $225

Barbados passports may also be issued outside Barbados, for which fees vary per country.

Format
Paper size B7 (ISO/IEC 7810 ID-3, 88 mm × 125 mm)
32 pages (passports with more pages can be issued to frequent travellers)

Cover
Barbados passports are dark blue in colour, with logo of CARICOM and the words CARIBBEAN COMMUNITY followed by BARBADOS inscribed on top of the booklet.  The Barbados coat of arms is prominently emblazoned in the centre of the cover page, followed on the bottom by the inscription of the words PASSPORT on ordinary passports, and DIPLOMATIC PASSPORT on diplomatic passports. Underneath that is the international biometric symbol.

Identification page
The following information is printed on the identification page, in: English, French, and Spanish.

{|
|-
|1. Photo of Passport Holder
|2. Type (PR for passport)
|-
|3. Code of Issuing State (BRB)
|4. Passport Number
|-
|5. Surname
|6. Given name(s)
|-
|7. Nationality (Barbados citizenship)
|8. Date of birth
|-
|9. National Identification Number
|10. Sex
|-
|10. Place of birth
|11. Holder's signature
|-
|12. Date of issue
|13. Date of expiry
|-
|14. Issuing authority 
|}

Passport photographs
The standards are:
 
 Front view, full face, open eyes, closed mouth, and natural expression
 Full head from top of hair to shoulders
 White background
 No shadows on face or in background
 No sunglasses; face obstructions, or hats
 Normal contrast and lighting

Passport statement
Barbados passports contain on their inside cover the following words in English only:

Current version 
In November 2021 the Barbados government transformed to a republican form of government. Follow the change there were some changes made to the passport.

Commonwealth realm version

1960s colonial version

Visa requirements for Barbadian citizens 

As of 19 July 2022, Barbadian citizens had visa-free or visa on arrival access to 163 countries and territories, ranking the Barbadian passport 23rd in terms of travel freedom according to the Henley visa restrictions index. The Barbados passport ranks 1st among CARICOM passport holders that enjoy travel freedom and visa-free access.

Holders of a Barbados passport may travel without a visa, or receive a visa upon arrival, to many other countries. As of 28 May 2009, Barbados signed a short-stay visa waiver agreement with the European Union.  The agreement allows citizens of Barbados to visit the countries of Europe who are members of the Schengen Area for up to three months in any six-month period without a visa.  Similarly, citizens of Europe (who countries are members of the Schengen Area) will be able to visit Barbados for the same period without a visa.

Caribbean
 Visa policy toward Barbadians in the region
 British
 Dutch
 French

Gallery of historical images

See also
 Visa requirements for Barbadian citizens
 Henley & Partners Visa Restrictions Index
 Visa Policy of Barbados
 Government of Barbados
 Commonwealth citizen
 Barbados nationality law
 Foreign relations of Barbados
 CARICOM passport

Notes

Further reading 

 E-passport implmented in 2018.
 Changes made in pages in 2020
 Design colours of republic passport.

External links
  of the Barbados Immigration Department
 Council Decision 7518/08 – Council of the European Union Decision on the signing and provisional application of the Agreement between the European Community and Barbados on the short-stay visa waiver

Barbados
Law of Barbados
Foreign relations of Barbados
Passport